A gay ball may refer to:
A cross-dressing ball, especially one whose participants are gay men
Ball culture, an LGBT Black and Latino American offshoot of the earlier cross-dressing balls, initially based in New York City